Kokott may refer to:
 Gothard Kokott (1943–2021), Polish football player
 Heinz Kokott (1900–1976), German general
 Juliane Kokott (born 1957), German EU official
 Lu, a kokott, 1918 Hungarian film

See also
 
 Cocotte (disambiguation)
 Kokot (disambiguation)

Polish-language surnames